Lars Justin Hirschfeld (born 17 October 1978) is a Canadian retired soccer goalkeeper. He is currently the goalkeeping coach for FC Edmonton.

Club career

Born in Edmonton, Alberta, of German descent, Hirschfeld started his career with the Edmonton Drillers, playing indoor soccer. He has also played with Energie Cottbus in Germany, Calgary Storm, and Vancouver Whitecaps.

England and Scotland
In September 2002, he joined Premier League club Tottenham Hotspur, but never featured for the first team. He went on loan to Luton Town and Gillingham before being released and joining Dundee United in August 2004. A move to Leicester City followed in January 2005, but Hirschfeld only made one start, keeping a clean sheet against Plymouth Argyle, during the remainder of the 04/05 season.

Norway
Tromsø IL then signed him as a replacement goalkeeper for the remainder of the Norwegian 2005-season. Hirschfeld made some crucial saves during Tromsø's campaign to avoid relegation and was a key figure in the UEFA Cup matches against Esbjerg fB and Galatasaray, both of which Tromsø won. Nordlys, a local newspaper, called Hirschfeld the greatest goalkeeper ever to play for Tromsø IL after only 6 matches at his new club, ranking him ahead of Einar Rossbach, Knut Borch and Bjarte Flem.

The following season, Hirschfeld won the Norwegian Tippeligaen with Rosenborg, having beaten Espen Johnsen for first-string goalie at the club. Hirschfeld was in goal when Rosenborg defeated Valencia CF twice in the UEFA Champions League 2007-08 group stage, recording two clean sheets in home-and-away 2-0 wins. He made a number of saves in his side's 1–1 draw away to English club Chelsea, the last match in charge of Chelsea for manager José Mourinho.

CFR Cluj
Hirschfeld played for CFR Cluj in Romania after joining from Rosenborg for €1,300,000 on 6 January 2008. With Cluj he immediately won the domestic double but he only played in 5 games in that first (half) season and he did not play at all for them in 2008/2009.

Energie Cottbus
He signed a two-year contract with Energie Cottbus on 26 June 2009.

Return to Norway
On 15 January 2010, he left his club Energie Cottbus and signed for Oslo club Vålerenga Fotball in Norway.

On 21 January 2016 he signed with KFUM which were promoted to the OBOS-ligaen (Norwegian second level) for the first time in 2015.

Coaching career
In January 2019 Hirschfeld joined FC Edmonton as their goalkeeping coach.

International career
He made his debut for Canada in a January 2000 friendly match against Bermuda but had to compete with Pat Onstad for the national goalkeeper's jersey. By November 2009, he earned a total of 29 caps. He has represented Canada in 6 FIFA World Cup qualification matches. Hirschfeld's big break with Canada came at the 2002 CONCACAF Gold Cup, where he was named the best goalkeeper of the tournament after allowing only four goals in five matches and recording an impressive semifinal shutout against the United States. This caused English club Tottenham Hotspur F.C. to take interest, and Hirschfeld signed with them in September 2002. On 8 June 2012, Hirschfeld was sent off in a 2014 World Cup qualifier against Cuba for handling the ball outside his penalty area, but Canada prevailed by a score of 1-0 despite the numerical disadvantage.

Honours

Individual
CONCACAF Gold Cup Most Valuable Goalkeeper: 2002
The Voyageurs Player of the Year:
Third place: 2007

Club

Rosenborg BK
 Norwegian Premier League: 2006

CFR Cluj
 Liga I: 2007-08
 Romanian Cup: 2008-09

References

External links

Player info - Rosenborg

1978 births
Living people
2002 CONCACAF Gold Cup players
2003 CONCACAF Gold Cup players
2011 CONCACAF Gold Cup players
2013 CONCACAF Gold Cup players
2015 CONCACAF Gold Cup players
Association football goalkeepers
Association football goalkeeping coaches
Calgary Storm players
Canada men's international soccer players
Canada men's under-23 international soccer players
Canadian expatriate soccer players
Canadian expatriate sportspeople in Germany
Canadian expatriate sportspeople in Norway
Canadian expatriate sportspeople in Romania
Canadian people of German descent
Canadian soccer players
Dundee United F.C. players
Edmonton Drillers (1996–2000) players
Expatriate footballers in England
Expatriate footballers in Germany
Expatriate footballers in Norway
Expatriate footballers in Romania
Expatriate footballers in Scotland
CFR Cluj players
FC Edmonton coaches
FC Energie Cottbus players
FC Energie Cottbus II players
Gillingham F.C. players
Leicester City F.C. players
Liga I players
Luton Town F.C. players
National Professional Soccer League (1984–2001) players
Eliteserien players
Rosenborg BK players
Scottish Premier League players
Soccer players from Edmonton
English Football League players
Tottenham Hotspur F.C. players
Tromsø IL players
KFUM-Kameratene Oslo players
A-League (1995–2004) players
USL League Two players
Vålerenga Fotball players
Vancouver Whitecaps (1986–2010) players
Canadian expatriate sportspeople in Scotland
Canadian expatriate sportspeople in England